A constitutional referendum was held in the Central African Republic on 13 and 14 December 2015. The referendum was originally scheduled to be held on 5 October 2015, prior to general elections, but was later delayed. Violence on polling day led to voting being extended for another day. The new constitution was approved by 93% of voters. General elections followed on 30 December.

Background

The new constitution was approved by a large majority in the Transitional Council on 30 August 2015. It provides for the creation of a Senate and a National Election Authority, as well as requiring decisions made by the President and Prime Minister to be approved by ministers, and for the government to inform the National Assembly when a contract relating to mineral resources is signed. Only 15,000 copies of the new constitution were published.

Results

References

2015
2015 referendums
2015 in the Central African Republic
Constitutional referendums
2015